Scarlet is a metalcore band from Richmond, Virginia currently on a long term hiatus.

History 
Scarlet formed in Yorktown, Virginia in the late 1990s. In 2000, the band released its first EP Breaking the Dead Stare.  Shortly afterward, Scarlet disbanded with Jon Spencer leaving to perform vocals for Virginia Beach-based metalcore band, Spitfire.  Scarlet reformed in 2003 with Spencer returning on vocals.  Scarlet released Something to Lust About on Ferret Music.  The EP served as a teaser for Scarlet's first full-length album, Cult Classic.  At its live shows prior to Cult Classic's release, Scarlet would perform Something to Lust About straight through.  Cult Classic was released in March 2004 on Ferret Music.  After Cult Classic's release, Spencer again left Scarlet to perform vocals for Spitfire.  While recording local Richmond band, Forever in a Day (FIAD)'s 2005 Demo, Andres Magnusson recruited FIAD's singer to perform vocals for Scarlet.  In mid 2005, Scarlet was reformed with Brandon Roundtree performing vocals.  Scarlet released its second full-length album, This Was Always Meant To Fall Apart in January 2006.  After completing a US tour in support of the record, Brandon Roundtree left Scarlet to form Conditions.  Scarlet is on hiatus and are currently working on other projects.  Andreas Magnusson engineers and produces music at his recording studio.  Randy Vanderbilt continues to create music with his new band, These City Limits.

In August 2014, Scarlet released 2 new songs recorded in 2009 entitled "The Acid Reign I" and "The Acid Reign II".

Members 
Last Known Line-up
 Brandon Roundtree – vocals
 Andreas Magnusson –  drums, electronics
 Randy Vanderbilt –  guitar, vocals (Spitfire)
 Bryan Tolbert –  guitar

Former members
 Jon Spencer –  vocals (Spitfire)
 Dan Tulloh –  Guitar (Spitfire)
 Chris Hagen –  Bass

Touring members
 Riley Emminger –  Bass
 Brian Nichols – Bass

Discography

References

External links
 Myspace

Musical groups from Virginia
Metalcore musical groups from Virginia
Heavy metal musical groups from Virginia
Ferret Music artists